The Swindle is a stealth action game developed by Size Five Games. The game was released for Windows, OS X, PlayStation 3, PlayStation 4, PlayStation Vita, Xbox One, and Wii U in 2015.

The game received generally positive reception, with critics praising the game's setting and tense gameplay.

Gameplay
The game takes place over 100 days. Each day a thief is sent on a heist to a part of London. The thief can search the region for money, avoiding or destroying a variety of guard robots patrolling the grounds. The thief can employ a variety of tools to destroy walls and other obstacles, hack computers for additional funds, or bug locations to turn them into income streams.

Other gameplay elements include perma-death, as a thief can die in a variety of ways, or become stuck and eliminated with a suicide pill to avoid capture, and the player assumes another thief on the following night.

Plot
Set in a steampunk variation of London, The Swindle follows a group of thieves who are attempting to hijack an AI being developed by Scotland Yard. If the AI is completed, the thieves' exploits will be at an end.

Reception 
The game received generally positive reception, with an aggregate score of 70/100 on Metacritic based on reviews from 25 critics.

Jordan Erica Webber of PC Gamer rated the game 80/100, calling the game's interface "streamlined and readable" and the game itself "immensely satisfying".

Zack Furniss of Destructoid rated the game 75/100, calling it "a festival of moments, of anecdotes filled with failures and smiles", but criticized the game for having potential bugs and exploits, as well as a "weird bloom effect" and "wonky" collision.

James Cunningham of Hardcore Gamer rated the game 70/100, calling the controls "troubling" and a "work in progress", but saying it was "awfully close to being excellent" due to the variety of enemies, art style and large amount of tools at the player's disposal.

References

2015 video games
Action video games
MacOS games
PlayStation 3 games
PlayStation 4 games
PlayStation Vita games
Stealth video games
Wii U games
Windows games
Xbox One games
Video games using procedural generation
Video games developed in the United Kingdom
Steampunk video games
Size Five Games games